Mallard Lake is a lake in Aitkin County, Minnesota, in the United States.

Mallard Lake was named for the mallard ducks seen there.

See also
List of lakes in Minnesota

References

Lakes of Minnesota
Lakes of Aitkin County, Minnesota